Winter Flies is a 2018 Czech-Slovak-Polish-Slovenian co-production road movie drama by Slovenian director Olmo Omerzu. It premiered at Karlovy Vary International Film Festival on 1 July 2018.

Olmo Omerzu has won a Best Director Award at  Karlovy Vary International Film Festival. It was selected as the Czech entry for the Best Foreign Language Film at the 91st Academy Awards, but it was not nominated.

Plot
The film follows two boys - Mára and Heduš. Heduš runs away from home. He joins Mára who tells him that he is running away from home. They drive through countryside in a Mára's car. They meet hitchhiker Bára who joins them. Both boys dream about having sex with her but she locks herself in the car during night and boys have to sleep outside. Mára reveals to Heduš that he goes to his grandfather who is a retired military officer. Boys eventually get to Mára's grandfather who suffers a heart attack and boys get him to hospital. Mára is later arrested by 2 police officers who interrogate him. The film ends when Heduš creates an incident outside the police station which allows Mára to escape.

Cast
 Tomáš Mrvík as Mára
 Jan František Uher as Heduš
 Eliška Křenková as Bára
 Lenka Vlasáková as Policewoman
 Martin Pechlát as Policeman

Production
Petr Pýcha has written radio play inspired by a story he read on an internet. His play was refused for vulgarity and he decide to rewrite it to a film screenplay. Pýcha saw Omerzu's previous film A Night Too Young and decided to ask Omerzu to direct the film. Omerzu liked it and started preparations of the film. Casting for main roles took very long  Omerzu wanted non-actors who can find themselves in their characters. The film was mostly shot in North Bohemia.

Release
The film premiered at 2018 Karlovy Vary International Film Festival. The film had a journalist projection on 24 August 2018. It was followed by press conference during which filmmakers were questioned about the film. The film was distributed to Czech cinemas on 4 September 2018 and later presented at multiple International film festivals.

Reception

Accolades

See also
 List of submissions to the 91st Academy Awards for Best Foreign Language Film
 List of Czech submissions for the Academy Award for Best Foreign Language Film

References

External links
 

2018 films
2010s drama road movies
Czech Film Critics' Awards winners
Czech Lion Awards winners (films)
Czech drama road movies
2010s Czech-language films